Dat Whoopty Woop is the debut album from Long Beach, California producer and rapper Soopafly. The album came out on July 31, 2001.

Production and features
The album was produced by Soopafly and Daz Dillinger. The album has featuring guests such as Tray Deee from Tha Eastsidaz, Bad Azz, Kurupt, Richie Rich, Gonzoe from Ice Cube group Kausion and Snoop Dogg.

Track listing
All songs are produced by Soopafly and Daz Dillinger

References

2001 debut albums
Soopafly albums
D.P.G. Recordz albums
Albums produced by Daz Dillinger
Albums produced by L.T. Hutton
Albums produced by Soopafly